Mount Sidley is the highest dormant volcano in Antarctica, a member of the Volcanic Seven Summits, with a summit elevation of . It is a massive, mainly snow-covered shield volcano which is the highest of the five volcanic mountains that comprise the Executive Committee Range of Marie Byrd Land. The feature is marked by a 5 km wide caldera on the southern side and stands NE of Mount Waesche in the southern part of the range.

The mountain was discovered by Rear Admiral Richard E. Byrd on an airplane flight, on November 18, 1934, and named by him for Mabelle E. Sidley, the daughter of William Horlick who was a contributor to the 1933–35 Byrd Antarctic Expedition.
Despite its height, the volcano's extremely remote location means that it is little known even in the mountaineering world compared to the much more accessible Mount Erebus, the second highest Antarctic volcano which is located near the U.S. and New Zealand bases on Ross Island.

The first recorded ascent of Mount Sidley was by New Zealander Bill Atkinson on January 11, 1990, whilst working in support of a United States Antarctic Program scientific field party.

See also
 List of volcanoes in Antarctica

Notes

References
 
 

Volcanic Seven Summits
Polygenetic shield volcanoes
Calderas of Antarctica
Volcanoes of Marie Byrd Land
Four-thousanders of Antarctica
Executive Committee Range
Pliocene shield volcanoes